Crash 'n' Burn is an experimental film shot in and named after Toronto, Ontario, Canada's first punk club by Canadian filmmaker Ross McLaren in 1977. (Not to be confused with Peter Vronsky's 1977 documentary on Toronto Punk shot for the CBC television network.) The film, shot on 16mm black-and-white stock, features punk rock performances by the Dead Boys, Teenage Head, The Boyfriends, and the Diodes.

Critical response
Village Voice critic Ed Halter called the film a "self-destructive document of Toronto's eponymous punk club."

The film's most frequently-quoted review, written almost one year after the initial screening, was published in Creem magazine in 1978.  Creem hailed McLaren's work for "doing everything in its flickering power to self-destruct," and deemed the film a living testament that not all Canadians "bored their beef to death."

Versions
McLaren's original work emphasized the cacophony and riotousness of the punk scene in 1977 Toronto.  In 2004, he debuted a karaoke-style version of the film – complete with syncopated subtitles corresponding to the bands' song lyrics – to a test audience at the Millennium Film Workshop in New York City.

Distribution
16mm prints of McLaren's film are exclusively distributed by The Film-Makers' Cooperative in the United States, and the Canadian Filmmakers' Distribution Centre in Canada.

Crash 'n' Burn has never been officially released on either VHS or DVD, though several bootleg VHS versions are rumoured to have been shown publicly since the 1990s, without official authorization from the filmmaker or his distributors.

See also
Punk film
List of punk films

References

Further reading
 Kelly, B.  "Punk at the Movies," Graffiti No. 2, vol.#4, 1986.
 O'Connor, Alan.  "Local Scenes and Dangerous Crossroads: Punk and Theories of Cultural Hybridity," Popular Music Vol. 21/2, Cambridge University Press, London: 225–36, 2002.
 Wlaschin, K.  "Rock Movies in the 70's," British Film Institute: London, 1978.

1977 films
Punk films
Canadian avant-garde and experimental short films
1970s English-language films
1970s Canadian films

et:Punkfilmide loend